Emily Owen (November 28, 1871 – October 18, 1905) was an English opera singer and actress, best known for her performances in soprano roles of the Savoy Operas with the D'Oyly Carte Opera Company. Beginning as a child actress, she performed for two decades before falling ill on tour and dying at age 33.

Early life and career
Owen was born in Bristol, where she made her theatrical debut at the Prince's Theatre at the age of eleven. In 1891, Owen joined the D'Oyly Carte Opera Company on tour, playing the small role of Cheetah in The Nautch Girl.  She left the company to appear in a Christmas pantomime in Birmingham, returning to tour with the company in 1892 as Cynthia in The Vicar of Bray and as Polly in the companion piece, Captain Billy.  Late in the tour, she played Nance in Arthur Sullivan's Haddon Hall.

In 1893, she continued to play Nance at the Savoy Theatre. She then created the parts of Rose in Jane Annie (1893, and on tour), Princess Nekaya in Gilbert and Sullivan's Utopia, Limited (1893–94), Zerbinette in Mirette (1894), and Juanita in Sullivan's The Chieftain (1894–95, and on tour). She also filled in briefly in the title role in Mirette in July and August 1894. In 1895, she toured as Juanita and first as Lady Saphir, and then as the title character in Gilbert and Sullivan's Patience. When The Gondoliers replaced The Chieftain later in the tour, she added the role of Gianetta.

Owen played Peep-Bo in the November 1895 revival of The Mikado at the Savoy Theatre. Next, she created the role of the Princess of Monte Carlo in The Grand Duke (1896), Gilbert and Sullivan's last opera. At the same time, she appeared as Maria in the curtain raiser After All! She was Peep-Bo again in 1896, and she played the female role, "She" in the curtain raiser, Weather or No. In August she filled in briefly in the leading role of Yum-Yum in The Mikado.

Owen left the D'Oyly Carte Opera Company to appear as Suzanne in the musical comedy Monte Carlo in the fall of 1896, but she re-joined the D'Oyly Carte to tour South Africa from December 1896 to June 1897, appearing in the leading soprano roles, including the title role in Patience, Phyllis in Iolanthe, Yum-Yum, Elsie Maynard in The Yeomen of the Guard, Gianetta and Nekaya.  She returned to the Savoy in July and August 1897 to play Elsie during the first London revival of Yeomen, then left the company again to play Anita in a revival of La Périchole in late 1897.

Later career and early death
At the Savoy in 1898, Owen sang Gianetta, created the role of Jacqueline in Sullivan's The Beauty Stone, and played Constance in a revival of The Sorcerer. In 1899, she created the role of Lazuli in The Lucky Star and sang Cousin Hebe in H.M.S. Pinafore. She then created the role of Honey-of-Life in Sullivan's last completed opera, The Rose of Persia (1899–1900), before leaving the D'Oyly Carte organisation for the last time. She returned to playing in pantomime, appearing as the principal girl in Cinderella at the Shakespeare Theatre, Clapham Junction (1900–01), before touring Australia and New Zealand with George Musgrove's company in pantomime and comic opera. On that tour, at the age of 29, she fell seriously ill. She was able to return to England in 1902, but she never recovered.

She died in Crundale, Kent, in 1905 at age 33.

References
Information about curtain raisers in which Owen appeared
 
Murray, Roderic.  "Emmie Owen" in The Gaiety, Spring 2005 issue
 Introduction by Martyn Green.
Emie Owen at Who Was Who in the D'Oyly Carte

External links

Page includes reviews of Owen's performance in The Grand Duke
Photographs of Owen
Photo of Owen and list of roles
Photo of Owen in The Grand Duke
Lists programmes showing Owen in various roles

1871 births
1905 deaths
English operatic sopranos
Musicians from Bristol
Actresses from Bristol
English stage actresses
19th-century British women singers